The Gibson ES-330 (1959-1972) is a thinline hollow-body electric guitar model produced by the Gibson Guitar Corporation. It was first introduced in 1959 and the guitar had the same dimensions as the ES-335.

History
Sales of Gibson’s Electric Spanish guitars (ES-100 through ES-350) in the 1930s and 1940s encouraged the company to continue to produce more electric guitars. In 1955 Gibson released the ES-225T and the Gibson ES-350T ("T" is for thinline). In 1957 Gibson designed a new design which was the ES-335 double-cutaway and released it in 1958. The ES-330 was released by the Gibson Guitar Company in 1959. In 1959 when the 330 was released the retail price was $275. The 330s came in two different designs, a one P-90 guitar pickup model called the ES-330T and a two pickup model called the ES-330TD.

Specifications
The ES-335 was released in 1958 and it had the same dimensions as the ES-330. The 330s had a maple top, back and sides with two F Holes in the top. Initially the neck met the body of the 330 at the 16th fret, but the ES-335 neck met the body at the 19th-fret. In 1968 Gibson changed the design to have the 330 neck meet the body at the 19th fret. The 330 also differed from the 335 because it was hollow, while the 335s had a center block to prevent feedback. 330's also had P-90 pickups while the 335s had humbuckers. The 330 had a mahogany neck with dot inlays and a 22-fret Brazilian Rosewood fretboard. The guitars also had a nickel-plated trapeze-style tailpiece. The guitar was released in three different finishes: cherry, sunburst and natural. In 1970 it was later released in a walnut finish.

Reception 
The guitar was prone to feedback because of its hollow design. By the time the guitar was released in 1959 the trend in music was for loud music. The 330 was not favored because of the trend toward loud guitar driven music. The ES-330 was discontinued in 1972.

References

ES-330
Semi-acoustic guitars
1959 in music
Discontinued products